Bad Girl is a 2012 French drama film directed by Patrick Mille.

Plot 
Louise will have a child. Her mother, in remission from chemotherapy, and her father, a rock singer, resume contact with her.

Cast 
 Carole Bouquet as Alice
 Arthur Dupont as Pablo
 Izïa as Louise
 Bob Geldof as George
 Jacques Weber as Professor Lecoq
 Joana Preiss as Brigitte
 Eric Savin as Doctor Lippi
 Laurent Cotillard as Pascal
 Pierre Louis-Calixte as Hervé
 Lison Mailhol as Angèle
 Joseph Malerba as Pablo's friend
 Marcel Bozonnet as The Monk
 Benoît Jacquot as The Director
 Patrick Pelloux as The Doctor

Accolades

References

External links 

2012 films
2012 drama films
French drama films
2012 directorial debut films
2010s French-language films
2010s French films
French pregnancy films